The Jaguar C-XF (or Concept-XF) was a concept car that was designed to showcase the preliminary styling cues of the yet to be announced Jaguar XF. The C-XF was unveiled in the 2007 North American International Auto Show with the production version of the XF announced in the Autumn of 2007 at the Frankfurt Motor Show.

The C-XF project was led by Jaguar Director of Design Ian Callum and Head of Advanced Design Julian Thomson. It featured a 4.2-litre supercharged V8 engine, a 6-speed automatic transmission with Jaguar Sequential Shift, single slim-wedged headlamps which have evolved from the twin-lamp motif seen on past Jaguars, performance-themed interior, JaguarDrive Selector, Dual View screen, and a Bowers & Wilkins audio system.

A prototype with a body styling that was based on the S-Type had also been built, but was rejected before the C-XF concept was finalised.

External links
 C-XF page at the Jaguar Daimler Heritage Trust

References 

C-XF
Sedans